Lubov Nikolayevna Yegorova (Любовь Николаевна Егорова; 8 August 1880 – 18 August 1972) was a Russian Empire ballerina who danced with the Imperial Ballet and the Ballets Russes.

Life and career
Lubov Yegorova was born in St. Petersburg, Russia. She studied ballet at the Imperial Theatre School in St. Petersburg with Ekaterina Vazem, Enrico Cecchetti and Anna Johansson. After graduating in 1898, she started work as a coryphée in the Imperial Ballet at Maryinsky Theatre and became a ballerina in 1914. A role as Myrtha in Giselle brought her to the attention of Sergei Diaghilev who cast her in the role of Princess Florine in The Sleeping Beauty in 1918, where she danced with Vaslav Nijinsky. She also went on to dance other roles with the Ballets Russes.

Yegorova's farewell performance in 1917 at the Maryinsky Theatre was in Swan Lake. However, she continued to dance, and in 1921 she interpreted the role of Aurora in Diaghilev's Sleeping Princess production in London. After retiring from the stage, she taught as head of the Ballet Russe school in Paris from 1923-1968, and founded the  company in 1937. She received the Chevalier de l'Ordre des arts et lettres in 1964. Notable students included Serge Lifar, Anton Dolin, Yvonne Mounsey, Catherine Littlefield, and Zelda Fitzgerald, who described studying under "Madame" in 1925, in her novel Save Me the Waltz. Another of her students was Lucia Joyce, daughter of the Irish writer James Joyce.

Personal life
In November 1917, Yegorova married Prince Nikita Sergeievitch Trubetzkoy (1877-1963), whose father was Director of the Hermitage Museum. Having lost her fortune through mismanagement, she died in a nursing home in Paris in 1972.

References

1880 births
1972 deaths
19th-century women from the Russian Empire
20th-century ballet dancers
Ballets Russes dancers
Mariinsky Ballet dancers
Russian princesses by marriage
Prima ballerinas
Ballerinas from the Russian Empire
White Russian emigrants to France
Trubetskoy family